Buanlu (also Romanized as Būānlū and Bavānlū) is a village in Sivkanlu Rural District, in the Central District of Shirvan County, North Khorasan Province, Iran. At the 2006 census, its population was 818, in 204 families.

References 

Populated places in Shirvan County